The Open Automotive Alliance (OAA) is an alliance of automotive manufacturers and technology companies aimed at using Android in automobiles.  It was announced at CES on January 6, 2014.

Members 

The members of the Open Automotive Alliance are:

See also 
 Android Auto
 CarPlay, formerly iOS in the Car
 Windows Embedded Automotive
 Ford Sync
 Open Handset Alliance
 QNX
 NNG

References

External links 
 Open Automotive Alliance

2014 establishments in California
Automotive technologies
Android (operating system)
Business organizations based in the United States
Open standards
Organizations based in California
Organizations established in 2014
Technology consortia